Louis de Jager (born 30 March 1987) is a professional golfer from South Africa playing on the Sunshine Tour.

De Jager was born in Duiwelskloof, Northern Transvaal. He won the South African Amateur Championship in 2007 in both the stroke play and match play format. In 2007, de Jager also won the Gauteng North Etonic Open and the Boland Open. He turned professional in 2008.

De Jager played his first full season on the Sunshine Tour in 2008. He played in 17 events and recorded five top-10 finishes. He won his first professional tournament in August 2009 at the Suncoast Classic.

Amateur wins
2007 South African Amateur Stroke Play Championship, South African International Amateur Match-play Championship, Gauteng North Etonic Open, Boland Open
Source:

Professional wins (8)

Sunshine Tour wins (5)

Sunshine Tour playoff record (3–0)

IGT Pro Tour wins (3)

See also
2018 European Tour Qualifying School graduates

References

External links

South African male golfers
Sunshine Tour golfers
Afrikaner people
1987 births
Living people